Dolj County (originally meant Dol(no)-Jiu, "lower Jiu", as opposed to Gorj (upper Jiu)) is a county (județ) of Romania on the border with Bulgaria, in Oltenia, with the capital city at Craiova.

Demographics 

 Romanians – over 96%
 Romani – 3%
 Other minorities –  1%

Geography

The entire area is a plain with the Danube on the south forming a wide valley crossed by the Jiu River in the middle. Other small rivers flow through the county, each one forming a small valley. There are some lakes across the county and many ponds and channels in the Danube valley. 6% of the county's area is a desert.

Neighbours

Olt County to the east.
Mehedinți County to the west.
Gorj County and Vâlcea County to the north.
Bulgaria – Vidin Province to the southwest, Montana and Vratsa provinces to the south.

Economy
Agriculture is the county's main industry. The county has a land that is ideal for growing cereals, vegetables, and wines. Other industries are mainly located in the city of Craiova, the largest city in southwestern Romania.

The county's main industries:
 Automotive industry – Ford has a factory.
 Heavy electrical and transport equipment – Electroputere Craiova is the largest factory plant in Romania.
 Aeronautics
 Chemicals processing
 Foods and beverages
 Textiles
 Mechanical parts and components

There are two small ports on the shore of the Danube river – Bechet and Calafat.

People 

 Corneliu Baba
 Tudor Gheorghe
 
 Alexandru Macedonski
 Titu Maiorescu
 Amza Pellea
 Gheorghe Popescu
 Doina Ruști
 Francisc Șirato
 Marin Sorescu
 Nicolae Titulescu
 Ion Țuculescu
 Nicolae Vasilescu-Karpen
 Mihai Viteazul

Tourism
Major tourist attractions:
 The city of Craiova;
 The city of Calafat;
 Fishing on the Danube;
 The city of Băilești.

Politics 

The Dolj County Council, renewed at the 2020 local elections, consists of 36 counsellors, with the following party composition:

Administrative divisions

Dolj County 3 municipalities, 4 towns and 104 communes
Municipalities
Băilești
Calafat
Craiova – capital city; population: 243,765 (as of 2011)
Towns
Bechet
Dăbuleni
Filiași
Segarcea
Communes

Afumați
Almăj
Amărăștii de Jos
Amărăștii de Sus
Apele Vii
Argetoaia
Bârca
Bistreț
Botoșești-Paia
Brabova
Brădești
Braloștița
Bratovoești
Breasta
Bucovăț
Bulzești
Călărași
Calopăr
Caraula
Cârcea
Cârna
Carpen
Castranova
Catane
Celaru
Cerăt
Cernătești
Cetate
Cioroiași
Ciupercenii Noi
Coșoveni
Coțofenii din Dos
Coțofenii din Față
Daneți
Desa
Dioști
Dobrești
Dobrotești
Drăgotești
Drănic
Fărcaș
Galicea Mare
Galiciuica
Gângiova
Ghercești
Ghidici
Ghindeni
Gighera
Giubega
Giurgița
Gogoșu
Goicea
Goiești
Grecești
Întorsura
Ișalnița
Izvoare
Leu
Lipovu
Măceșu de Jos
Măceșu de Sus
Maglavit
Malu Mare
Mârșani
Melinești
Mischii
Moțăței
Murgași
Negoi
Orodel
Ostroveni
Perișor
Pielești
Piscu Vechi
Plenița
Pleșoi
Podari
Poiana Mare
Predești
Radovan
Rast
Robănești
Rojiște
Sadova
Sălcuța
Scăești
Seaca de Câmp
Seaca de Pădure
Secu
Siliștea Crucii
Șimnicu de Sus
Sopot
Tălpaș
Teasc
Terpezița
Teslui
Țuglui
Unirea
Urzicuța
Valea Stanciului
Vârtop
Vârvoru de Jos
Vela
Verbița

Historical county

Historically, the county was located in the southwestern part of Greater Romania, in the southwest part of the historical region of Oltenia. Its capital was Craiova. The interwar county territory comprised the central and southwestern part of the current Dolj county. It was bordered to the north with by the counties of Gorj and Valcea, to the west by Mehedinți County, to the east by Romanați County, and to the south by the Kingdom of Bulgaria.

Administration

The county was originally divided into six administrative districts (plăși):
Plasa Amaradia, headquartered at Melinești
Plasa Bârca, headquartered at Bârca
Plasa Calafat, headquartered at Calafat
Plasa Gângiova, headquartered at Gângiova
Plasa Ocolul, headquartered at Ocolul
Plasa Plenița, headquartered at Plenița

Subsequently, four districts were created in place of two of the prior districts (Plasa Bârca and Plasa Gângiova):
Plasa Bechet, headquartered at Bechet
Plasa Brabova, headquartered at Brabova
Plasa Filiași, headquartered at Filiași
Plasa Segarcea, headquartered at Segarcea

Population 
According to the 1930 census data, the county population was 485,149 inhabitants, ethnically divided as follows: 96.7% Romanian, 0.5% Jews, 0.3% Germans, 0.3% Hungarians, as well as other minorities. From the religious point of view, the population was 98.4% Eastern Orthodox, 0.7% Roman Catholic, 0.5% Jewish, as well as other minorities.

Urban population 
In 1930, the county's urban population was 91,788 inhabitants, comprising 90.2% Romanians, 2.4% Jews, 2.2% Romanies, 1.7% Germans, 1.3% Hungarians, as well as other minorities. From the religious point of view, the urban population was composed of 92.7% Eastern Orthodox, 3.1% Roman Catholic, 2.5% Jewish, 0.7% Lutheran, 0.3% Calvinist, 0.3% Greek Catholic, as well as other minorities.

References

External links

 
Counties of Romania
Place names of Slavic origin in Romania
1879 establishments in Romania
1938 disestablishments in Romania
1940 establishments in Romania
1950 disestablishments in Romania
1968 establishments in Romania
States and territories established in 1879
States and territories disestablished in 1938
States and territories established in 1940
States and territories disestablished in 1950
States and territories established in 1968